Arnaldo Caverzasi (born 12 January 1948) is an Italian former professional racing cyclist. He rode in the 1975 Tour de France and 1976 Tour de France.

References

External links
 

1948 births
Living people
Italian male cyclists
Cyclists from the Province of Varese
Tour de Suisse stage winners